Matthias Zurbriggen (15 May 1856 in Saas-Fee – 21 June 1917 in Geneva) was a Swiss mountaineer.  He climbed throughout the Alps, the Andes, the Himalayas and New Zealand.

Ascents 
He made many first ascents, the best known of which is Aconcagua in Argentina, the highest peak outside of Asia, which he climbed alone on 14 January 1897, during an expedition led by Edward FitzGerald. During the same expedition Zurbriggen also made the first ascent of Tupungato with Englishman Stuart Vines.

The Zurbriggen Ridge on Aoraki / Mount Cook in New Zealand is named after him. On 14 March 1895, Zurbriggen made the first ascent of the ridge, the second ascent of the mountain and its first solo ascent. He missed the honour of claiming the first ascent of Mount Cook, which was achieved a few months earlier, on Christmas Day 1894 by a party of New Zealanders who were determined to prevent the first ascent being credited to a foreigner.

Personal life 
Later in life, his fortune declined. He lived his last decade as a vagrant in his home country, and was found hanged in Geneva in 1917, an apparent suicide.

References

1856 births
1917 suicides
Alpine guides
Swiss mountain climbers
Suicides by hanging in Switzerland